The Libris Literature Award or Libris Prize (Dutch: Libris Literatuur Prijs) is a prize for novels originally written in Dutch. Established in 1993, it is awarded annually since 1994 by Libris, an association of independent Dutch booksellers, and amounts to 50,000 for the winner. It is modeled on the Booker Prize, having a longlist and a selection process which shortlists six books. The author of each shortlisted book receives 2,500.

Shortlisted authors are heavily promoted in individual Libris book stores, providing important commercial opportunities for authors and booksellers. Typically, the (independent) jury's selection is discussed and criticized in the Dutch press, providing even more exposure. The Libris Literature Award with the (Belgian) Golden Owl and the (Dutch) AKO Literatuurprijs make up the "big three" literature awards for Dutch-language books.

Winners
1994 – Frida Vogels – De harde kern 
1995 – Thomas Rosenboom – Gewassen vlees 
1996 – Alfred Kossmann – Huldigingen 
1997 – Hugo Claus – ''De geruchten 
1998 – J.J. Voskuil – Het bureau 3: Plankton 
1999 – Harry Mulisch – De procedure 
2000 – Thomas Rosenboom – Publieke Werken 
2001 – Tomas Lieske – Franklin 
2002 – Robert Anker – Een soort Engeland 
2003 – Abdelkader Benali – De langverwachte 
2004 – Arthur Japin – Een schitterend gebrek 
2005 – Willem Jan Otten – Specht en zoon 
2006 – K. Schippers – Waar was je nou 
2007 – Arnon Grunberg – Tirza 
2008 – D. Hooijer – Sleur is een roofdier 
2009 – Dimitri Verhulst – Godverdomse dagen op een godverdomse bol
2010 – Bernard Dewulf – Kleine dagen
2011 – Yves Petry – De maagd Marino
2012 – A.F.Th. van der Heijden – Tonio
2013 – Tommy Wieringa – Dit zijn de namen
2014 – Ilja Leonard Pfeijffer – La Superba
2015 – Adriaan van Dis – Ik kom terug
2016 – Connie Palmen – Jij zegt het
2017 – Alfred Birney – De tolk van Java
2018 – Murat Isik – Wees onzichtbaar
2019 – Rob van Essen – De goede zoon
2020 – Sander Kollaard – Uit het leven van een hond
2021 – Jeroen Brouwers – Cliënt E. Busken
2022 – Mariken Heitman – Wormmaan

References

External links

Awards established in 1994
1994 establishments in the Netherlands
Dutch literary awards
Fiction awards